In governance, sortition (also known as selection by lottery, selection by lot, allotment, demarchy, stochocracy, aleatoric democracy, democratic lottery, and lottocracy) is the selection of public officials or jurors using a random representative sample. This minimizes factionalism, since those selected to serve can prioritize studying the policy decisions in front of them instead of campaigning. In ancient Athenian democracy, sortition was the traditional and primary method for appointing political officials, and its use was regarded as a principal characteristic of democracy.

Today, sortition is commonly used to select prospective jurors in common-law systems. What has changed in recent years is the increased number of citizen groups with political advisory power,  and the growing calls for making sortition more consequential than elections, as it was in Athens, Venice and Florence.

History

Ancient Athens

Athenian democracy developed in the 6th century BC out of what was then called isonomia (equality of law and political rights). Sortition was then the principal way of achieving this fairness. It was utilized to pick most of the magistrates for their governing committees, and for their juries (typically of 501 men). Aristotle relates equality and democracy:

In Athens, "democracy" (literally meaning rule by the people) was in opposition to those supporting a system of oligarchy (rule by a few). Athenian democracy was characterised by being run by the "many" (the ordinary people) who were allotted to the committees which ran government. Thucydides has Pericles make this point in his Funeral Oration: "It is administered by the many instead of the few; that is why it is called a democracy."

The Athenians believed sortition, not elections, to be democratic and used complex procedures with purpose-built allotment machines (kleroteria) to avoid the corrupt practices used by oligarchs to buy their way into office. According to the author Mogens Herman Hansen, the citizen's court was superior to the assembly because the allotted members swore an oath which ordinary citizens in the assembly did not, therefore the court could annul the decisions of the assembly.
Both Aristotle and Herodotus (one of the earliest writers on democracy) emphasize selection by lot as a test of democracy, writing, "The rule of the people has the fairest name of all, equality (isonomia), and does none of the things that a monarch does. The lot determines offices, power is held accountable, and deliberation is conducted in public."

Past scholarship maintained that sortition had roots in the use of chance to divine the will of the gods, but this view is no longer common among scholars. In Ancient Greek mythology, Zeus, Poseidon, and Hades used sortition to determine who ruled over which domain. Zeus got the sky, Poseidon the sea, and Hades the underworld.

In Athens, to be eligible to be chosen by lot, citizens self-selected themselves into the available pool, then lotteries in the kleroteria machines. The magistracies assigned by lot generally had terms of service of one year. A citizen could not hold any particular magistracy more than once in his lifetime, but could hold other magistracies. All male citizens over 30 years of age, who were not disenfranchised by atimia, were eligible. Those selected through lot underwent examination called dokimasia to avoid incompetent officials. Rarely were selected citizens discarded. Magistrates, once in place, were subjected to constant monitoring by the Assembly. Magistrates appointed by lot had to render account of their time in office upon their leave, called euthynai. However, any citizen could request the suspension of a magistrate with due reason.

Lombardy and Venice – 12th to 18th century
The brevia was used in the city states of Lombardy during the 12th and 13th centuries and in Venice until the late 18th century. Men, who were chosen randomly, swore an oath that they were not acting under bribes, and then they elected members of the council. Voter and candidate eligibility probably included property owners, councilors, guild members, and perhaps, at times, artisans. The Doge of Venice was determined through a complex process of nomination, voting and sortition.

Lot was used in the Venetian system only in order to select members of the committees that served to nominate candidates for the Great Council. A combination of election and lot was used in this multi-stage process. Lot was not used alone to select magistrates, unlike in Florence and Athens. The use of lot to select nominators made it more difficult for political sects to exert power, and discouraged campaigning. By reducing intrigue and power moves within the Great Council, lot maintained cohesiveness among the Venetian nobility, contributing to the stability of this republic. Top magistracies generally still remained in the control of elite families.

Florence – 14th and 15th century
Scrutiny was used  in Florence for over a century starting in 1328. Nominations and voting together created a pool of candidates from different sectors of the city. The names of these men were deposited into a sack, and a lottery draw determined who would get to be a magistrate. The scrutiny was gradually opened up to minor guilds, reaching the greatest level of Renaissance citizen participation in 1378–1382.

In Florence, lot was used to select magistrates and members of the Signoria during republican periods. Florence utilized a combination of lot and scrutiny by the people, set forth by the ordinances of 1328. In 1494, Florence founded a Great Council in the model of Venice. The nominatori were thereafter chosen by lot from among the members of the Great Council, indicating a decline in aristocratic power.

The Enlightenment 
During the Age of Enlightenment, many of the political ideals originally championed by the democratic city-states of ancient Greece were revisited. The use of sortition as a means of selecting the members of government while receiving praise from notable Enlightenment thinkers, received almost no discussion during the formation of the American and French republics.

Montesquieu, for example, whose classic work The Spirit of Laws is often quoted in support of sortition, provides one of the most direct discussions of the concept in Enlightenment political writing. “The suffrage by lot,” he argues, “is natural to democracy; as that by choice is to aristocracy.” In making this statement about the democratic nature of sortition, Montesquieu echoes the philosophy of much earlier thinkers such as Aristotle, who also viewed election as aristocratic. Montesquieu caveats his support by saying that there should also be some mechanisms to ensure the pool of selection is competent and not corrupt.  Rousseau also found that a mixed model of sortition and election provided a healthier path for democracy than one or the other. Harrington, also found the Venetian model of sortition compelling, recommending it for his ideal republic of Oceana.

Bernard Manin, a French political theorist, points out the surprising nature of sortition’s decline during the Enlightenment in his 1997 book The Principles of Representative Government. “What is indeed astonishing,” he says, “in the light of the republican tradition and the theorizing it had generated, is the total absence of debate in the early years of representative government about the use of lot in the allocation of power.” There are several possible explanations as to what forces caused this demonstrated disinterest in the use of sortition in modern government. The first potential explanation that Manin offers is that the choosing of rulers by lot may have been viewed as impractical on such a large scale as the modern state. A second possible explanation given is that elections provided greater political consent than sortition.

However, David Van Reybrouck finds the following two reasons for this period's recession of sortition more compelling than Manin's:

1) The relatively limited knowledge about Athenian democracy, with the first thorough examination coming only in 1891 with Election by Lot at Athens.

2) Wealthy enlightenment figures preferred to retain more power by holding elections, with most not even offering excuses on the basis of practicality but plainly saying they preferred to retain significant elite power.

Switzerland
Because financial gain could be achieved through the position of mayor, some parts of Switzerland used random selection during the years between 1640 and 1837 to prevent corruption.

India
Local government in parts of Tamil Nadu such as the village of Uttiramerur traditionally used a system known as kuda-olai where the names of candidates for the village committee were written on palm leaves and put into a pot and pulled out by a child.

Methods

Before the random selection can be done, the pool of candidates must be defined. Systems vary as to whether they allot from eligible volunteers, from those screened by education, experience, or a passing grade on a test, or screened by election by those selected by a previous round of random selection, or from the membership or population at large. A multi-stage process in which random selection is alternated with other screening methods can be used, as in the Venetian system.

One robust, general, public method of allotment in use since 1997 is documented in RFC 3797: Publicly Verifiable Nominations Committee Random Selection. Using it, multiple specific sources of random numbers (e.g., lotteries) are selected in advance, and an algorithm is defined for selecting the winners based on those random numbers. When the random numbers become available, anyone can calculate the winners.

David Chaum, a pioneer in computer science and cryptography, proposed Random-Sample Elections in 2012. Via recent advances in computer science, it is now possible to select a random sample of eligible voters in a verifiably valid manner and empower them to study and make a decision on a matter of public policy. This can be done in a highly transparent manner which allows anyone to verify the integrity of the election, while optionally preserving the anonymity of the voters. A related approach has been pioneered by James Fishkin, director of the Center for Deliberative Democracy at Stanford, to make legally binding decisions in Greece, China and other countries.

In Ancient Greece, a Kleroterion was used to select eligible and willing citizens to serve jury duty. This bolstered the initial Athenian system of democracy by getting new and different jury members from each tribe to avoid corruption.

Modern application

Sortition is most commonly used to form citizens' assemblies. As an example, Vancouver council initiated a citizens' assembly that met in 2014–15 in order to assist in city planning.

Sortition is commonly used in selecting juries in Anglo-Saxon legal systems and in small groups (e.g., picking a school class monitor by drawing straws). In public decision-making, individuals are often determined by allotment if other forms of selection such as election fail to achieve a result. Examples include certain hung elections and certain votes in the UK Parliament. Some contemporary thinkers like David Van Reybrouck have advocated a greater use of selection by lot in today's political systems.

Sortition is also used in military conscription, as one method of awarding US green cards, and in placing students into some schools.

Non-governmental organizations 

Sortition also has potential for helping large associations to govern themselves democratically without the use of elections. Co-ops, employee-owned businesses, housing associations, Internet platforms, student governments, and countless other large membership organizations whose members generally do not know many other members yet seek to run their organization democratically often find elections problematic. The essential leadership decisions are made by the nomination process, often generating a self-perpetuating board whose nominating committee selects their own successors. Randomly selecting a representative sample of members to constitute a nominating panel is one procedure that has been proposed to keep fundamental control in the hands of ordinary members and avoid internal board corruption. For example, The Samaritan Ministries Health Plan sometimes uses a panel of 13 randomly selected members to resolve disputes, which sometimes leads to policy changes. Also, Democracy In Practice, an international organization dedicated to democratic innovation, experimentation and capacity-building, has implemented sortition in schools in Bolivia, replacing student government elections with lotteries. Lastly, in 2013 the New Zealand Health Research council began awarding funding at random to applicants considered equally qualified.

Public policy 
Perhaps the most common example in practice today, are law court juries which are formed through sortition in some countries, such as the United States and United Kingdom. An increasingly common set of examples includes Citizens' assemblies, which have been used to provide input to policy makers in countries like Ireland and Denmark. The selection of citizens may not be perfectly random, but still aims to be representative.

At a subnational level, the Amish use sortition applied to a slate of nominees when they select their community leaders. In their process, formal members of the community each register a single private nomination, and candidates with a minimum threshold of nominations then stand for the random selection that follows. In 2015 the city of Utrecht randomly invited 10,000 residents, of whom 900 responded and 165 were eventually chosen, to participate in developing its 2016 energy and climate plan. In 2019, the German speaking Ostbelgien region in Belgium, implemented the Ostbelgien Model, consisting of an 24-member Citizen's Council which convenes short term Citizen's Assemblies to provide non-binding recommendations to its parliament. Later that same year both the main and French-speaking parliaments of the Brussels-Capital Region voted to authorize setting up mixed parliamentary committees composed of parliamentarians and randomly selected citizens to draft recommendations on a given issue. Following the 1978 Meghalaya Legislative Assembly election, due to disagreements amongst the parties of the governing coalition, the Chief Minister's position was chosen by drawing lots. In 2004, a randomly selected group of citizens in British Columbia convened to propose a new electoral system. This Citizens' Assembly on Electoral Reform was repeated three years later in Ontario's citizens' assembly. 

MASS LBP, a Canadian company inspired by the work of the Citizens' Assemblies on Electoral Reform, has pioneered the use of Citizens' Reference Panels for addressing a range of policy issues for public sector clients. The Reference Panels use civic lotteries, a modern form of sortition, to randomly select citizen-representatives from the general public. A similar initiative in the United States, the Citizens' Initiative Review at Healthy Democracy, also uses a sortition based panel of citizen voters to review and comment on ballot initiative measures in the United States. The selection process utilizes random and stratified sampling techniques to create a representative 24-person panel which deliberates in order to evaluate the measure in question.

Political proposals for sortition

To select juries for specific issue(s) or policies 
Constitutional changes are one of the most common to solicit input via sortition. Étienne Chouard advocates strongly that those seeking power (elected officials) should not write the rules, making sortition an essential choice for creating constitutions. For example, the South Australian Constitutional Convention was a deliberative opinion poll created to consider changes to the state constitution.
Political scientist Robert A. Dahl suggests in his book Democracy and its Critics (p. 340) that an advanced democratic state could form groups which he calls minipopuli. Each group would consist "of perhaps a thousand citizens randomly selected out of the entire demos", and would either set an agenda of issues or deal with a particular major issue. It would "hold hearings, commission research, and engage in debate and discussion". Dahl suggests having the minipopuli as supplementing, rather than replacing, legislative bodies.
Simon Threlkeld, in the 1998 journal article "A Blueprint for Democratic Law-Making: Give Citizen Juries the Final Say" and later articles, proposes that laws be decided by legislative juries rather than by elected politicians or referendums. The existing legislatures would continue to exist and could propose laws to legislative juries, but would no longer be able to pass laws. Citizens, public interest groups and others would also be able to propose laws to legislative juries.
L. León coined the word lottocracy for a sortition procedure that is somewhat different from Burnheim's demarchy. While "Burnheim ... insists that the random selection be made only from volunteers", León states "that first of all, the job must not be liked". Christopher Frey uses the German term  and recommends testing lottocracy in town councils. Lottocracy, according to Frey, will improve the direct involvement of each citizen and minimize the systematical errors caused by political parties in Europe.
John Burnheim, in his book Is Democracy Possible?, describes a political system in which many small "citizens' juries" would deliberate and make decisions about public policies. His proposal includes the dissolution of the state and of bureaucracies. The term demarchy he uses was coined by Friedrich Hayek for a different proposal, unrelated to sortition, and is now sometimes used to refer to any political system in which sortition plays a central role.

To select public officials 
Simon Threlkeld, in the 1997 journal article "Democratizing Public Institutions: Juries for the selection of public officials" and later articles, proposes that a wide range of public officials be chosen by randomly sampled juries, rather than by politicians or popular election. As with "convened-sample suffrage", public officials are chosen by a random sample of the public from a relevant geographical area, such as a state governor being chosen by a random sample of citizens from that state.
Influenced by Burnheim, Marxist economists Allin Cottrell and Paul Cockshott propose that, to avoid formation of a new social elite in a post-capitalist society, "[t]he various organs of public authority would be controlled by citizens' committees chosen by lot" or partially chosen by lot. 
Anarcho-capitalist writer Terry Hulsey detailed a 28th Amendment to the U.S. Constitution to randomize the election of congressmen and senators, and indirectly, the President of the United States. The key to its success, in his opinion, is that the critical selection of the initial pool of candidates is left strictly to the states, to avoid litigation regarding "fairness" or perfect randomness. 
For example, "convened-sample suffrage" could use sortition to choose an electoral college for each electoral district. 
"Accidental Politicians: How Randomly Selected Legislators Can Improve Parliament Efficiency": shows how the introduction of a variable percentage of randomly selected independent legislators in a Parliament can increase the global efficiency of a legislature, in terms of both number of laws passed and average social welfare obtained (this work is in line with the recent discovery that the adoption of random strategies can improve the efficiency of hierarchical organizations "Peter Principle Revisited: a Computational Study").
Michael Donovan proposes that the percentage of voters who don't turnout have their representatives chosen by sortition. For example, with 60% voter turnout a number of legislators are randomly chosen to make up 40% of the overall parliament.

C. L. R. James's 1956 essay "Every Cook Can Govern" suggested to select, through sortition, a large legislative body (such as the U.S. Congress) from among the adult population at large.
Ernest Callenbach and Michael Phillips push for random selection of the U.S. House of Representatives in their book A Citizen Legislature (1985). They argue this scheme would ensure fair representation for the people and their interests, an elimination of many realpolitik behaviors, and a reduction in the influence of money and associated corruption, all leading to better legislation.
Étienne Chouard, a French political activist, proposes replacing elections with sortition.
The House of Commons in both Canada and the United Kingdom could employ randomly selected legislators.
The UK House of Lords has been proposed as an opportunity for sortition.
Terry Bouricius, a former Vermont legislator and political scientist, proposes in a 2013 journal article how a democracy could function better without elections, through the use of many randomly selected bodies, each with a defined role.
In his 2017 presidential election platform, French politician Jean-Luc Mélenchon of La France Insoumise lays out a proposal for a sixth republic. The upper house of this republic would be formed through national sortition. Additionally, the constituent assembly to create this republic would have 50% of its members chosen in this way, with the remainder being elected.

Opportunities

More representative
A modern advocate of sortition, political scientist John Burnheim, argues for systems of sortition as follows:

This advantage does not equally apply to the use of juries.

The representativeness and statistical properties of institutions like councils (committees), magistrates (cabinets) and juries selected by lot were mathematically examined by Andranik Tangian, who confirmed the validity of this method of appointment.

An inherent problem with electoral politics is the over-representation of politically active groups in society who tend to be those who join political parties. For example, in 2000 less than 2% of the UK population belonged to a political party, while in 2005 there were at best only 3 independent MPs (see List of UK minor party and independent MPs elected) so that 99.5% of all UK MPs belonged to a political party.

Cognitive diversity 
Cognitive diversity is an amalgamation of different ways of seeing the world and interpreting events within it, where a diversity of perspectives and heuristics guide individuals to create different solutions to the same problems. Cognitive diversity is not the same as gender, ethnicity, value-set or age diversity, although they are often positively correlated. According to numerous scholars such as Page and Landemore, cognitive diversity is more important to creating successful ideas than the average ability level of a group. This "diversity trumps ability theorem" is essential to why sortition is a viable democratic option. Simply put, random selection of persons of average intelligence performs better than a collection of the best individual problem solvers.

More efficient 
Magnus Vinding in his book Reasoned Politics argues that one of the main advantages of sortition is its comparative efficiency: first, according to the author, sortition “could allow political decision-makers to focus on studying and deciding on the relevant issues rather than worrying about sending the right signals to optimize their election prospects.” And second, “resources devoted to zero-sum pursuits, such as election campaigns and lobbies that fund opposing politicians, could instead be devoted to positive-sum endeavors.”

Less political 
Elected representatives typically rely on political parties in order to gain and retain office. This means they often feel a primary loyalty to the party and will vote contrary to conscience to support a party position. Representatives appointed by sortition do not owe anything to anyone for their position.

Sortition could also reduce political polarization by removing some of its sources like election campaigns and lobbies. In a broader cultural context, the media would potentially be less centered on presenting politics as a zero-sum game for votes between politicians or political parties, which could lead to less political polarization as well.

Fairer and more legitimate
Sortition is inherently egalitarian in that it ensures all citizens have an equal chance of entering office irrespective of any bias in society:

Random selection has the ability to overcome the various demographic biases in race, religion, sex, etc. apparent in most legislative assemblies. Greater perceived fairness can be added by using stratified sampling. For example, the Citizens' Assembly on Electoral Reform in British Columbia sampled one woman and one man from each electoral district and also ensured representation for First Nations members. Bias may still exist if particular groups are purposefully excluded from the lottery such as happened in Ancient Athens where women, slaves, younger men and foreigners were not eligible.

Less corruptible
Sortition may be less corruptible than voting. Author James Wycliffe Headlam explains that the Athenian Council (500 administrators randomly selected), would commit occasional mistakes such as levying taxes that were too high. Additionally, from time to time, some in the council would improperly make small quantities of money from their civic positions. However, "systematic oppression and organized fraud were impossible." These Greeks recognized that sortition broke up factions, diluted power, and gave positions to such a large number of disparate people that they would all keep an eye on each other, making collusion fairly rare. Furthermore, power did not necessarily go to those who wanted it and had schemed for it. The Athenians used an intricate machine, a kleroterion, to allot officers. Headlam also explains that "the Athenians felt no distrust of the lot, but regarded it as the most natural and the simplest way of appointment."

Like Athenian democrats, critics of electoral politics in the 21st-century argue that the process of election by vote is subject to manipulation by money and other powerful forces, and because legislative elections give power to a few powerful (often wealthy) groups, they are believed to be a less democratic system than selection by lot from among the population.

More democratic 
Greek writers who mention democracy (including Aristotle, Plato, and Herodotus) emphasize the role of selection by lot, or state outright that being allotted is more democratic than elections. For example,Montesquieu, founder of the modern constitutional state, repeated in his The Spirit of the Laws of 1748 the insight that Aristotle had expressed two millennia earlier, ‘Voting by lot is in the nature of democracy; voting by choice is in the nature of aristocracy.’ The elite character of elections was clear to him from the start. In contrast, he claimed, ‘the casting of lots is a way of electing that distresses no one; it leaves to each citizen a reasonable expectation of serving his country.'

The French Revolution, like the American, did not dislodge the aristocracy to replace it with a democracy but rather dislodged a hereditary aristocracy to replace it with an elected aristocracy, ‘une aristocratie élective’, to use Rousseau’s term. Robespierre even called it ‘une aristocratie représentative’...It derived its legitimacy no longer from God, soil or birth but from another relic of the aristocratic era, elections...The fiery revolutionary Jean-Paul Marat denounced the aristocratisation of the popular revolt and took up the cause of the more than eighteen million French people who were not given a vote. ‘What use is it to us,’ he wrote, ‘that we have broken the aristocracy of the nobles, if that is replaced by the aristocracy of the rich?’

Empowers and engages ordinary people
As participants grow in competence by contributing to deliberation, they also become more engaged and interested in civic affairs. Most societies have some type of citizenship education, but sortition-based committees allow ordinary people to develop their own democratic capacities through direct participation.

Concerns expressed

Are ordinary people competent enough to make big decisions?
The most common argument against pure sortition (that is, with no prior selection of an eligible group) is that it takes no account of skills or experience that might be needed to effectively discharge the particular offices to be filled. Were such a position to require a specific skill set, sortition could not necessarily guarantee the selection of a person whose skills matched the requirements of being in office unless the group from which the allotment is drawn were itself composed entirely of sufficiently specialized persons. This is why sortition was not used to select military commanders (strategos) in ancient Athens.

By contrast, systems of election or appointment ideally limit this problem by encouraging the matching of skilled individuals to jobs for which they are suited.

According to Xenophon (Memorabilia Book I, 2.9), this classical argument was offered by Socrates:

The same argument is made by Edmund Burke in his essay Reflections on the Revolution in France (1790):

Can sortition be less representative than elections?

If the process fails to capture a representative sample, there is a greater chance that sortition may elevate views that do not represent the views of the population from which they were drawn. This argument is mentioned by Isocrates in his essay Areopagiticus (section 23):

This is especially relevant for smaller juries which are more difficult to make representative than larger assemblies. The modern processes of jury selection and the rights to object to and exclude particular jurors by both the plaintiff and defence are used to potentially lessen the possibilities of a jury not being representative of the community or being prejudicial towards one side or the other. Today, therefore, even juries in most jurisdictions are not ultimately chosen through pure sortition.

Any legitimacy lost from not voting?
Those who see voting as expressing the "consent of the governed" maintain that voting is able to confer legitimacy in the selection. According to this view, elected officials can act with greater authority than when randomly selected. With no popular mandate to draw on, randomly selected politicians lose a moral basis on which to base their authority and are open to charges of illegitimacy.

Since it is statistically unlikely that a given individual will participate in the deliberative body, sortition creates two groups of people, the few randomly chosen politicians and the masses. Identifying the source of sortition's legitimacy has proven difficult. As a result, advocates of sortition have suggested limiting the use cases of sortition to serving as consultative or political agenda-setting bodies.

Any enthusiasm lost with jurors instead of politicians?
In an elected system, the representatives are to a degree self-selecting for their enthusiasm for the job. Under a system of pure, universal sortition the individuals are not chosen for their enthusiasm. Many electoral systems assign to those chosen a role as representing their constituents; a complex job with a significant workload. Elected representatives choose to accept any additional workload; voters can also choose those representatives most willing to accept the burden involved in being a representative. Individuals chosen at random from a comprehensive pool of citizens have no particular enthusiasm for their role and therefore may not make good advocates for a constituency.

Any accountability lost without re-election campaigns?
Leonardo Bruni ended up opposing sortition (despite noting some of its advantages) out of fear that sortition might not be able to disincentivize bad behavior in the same way he thought having to stand for re-election could.

See also
Citizens' assembly
Direct democracy
Jury selection
Wisdom of the crowd

References

External links
Equality by Lot blog — extensive news, discussions and general information on sortition
Sortition as a sustainable protection against oligarchy (2011 lecture) by Étienne Chouard (video in French with English subtitles)
Lists of writings on sortition
Equality by Lot's list of books (from 425 BC - 2020)
The Fetura or Sortition Option's list of writings (348 BC - 2002)
List of Simon Threlkeld's articles (1997-2020) proposing randomly sampled juries decide laws and choose public officials
List of sortition news from the Netherlands (2018-2022) (English-language)

Ancient Greece
Elections
Direct democracy
Sampling (statistics)
Democracy
Democratization